Tantalum pentoxide, also known as tantalum(V) oxide, is the inorganic compound with the formula . It is a white solid that is insoluble in all solvents but is attacked by strong bases and hydrofluoric acid.  is an inert material with a high refractive index and low absorption (i.e. colourless), which makes it useful for coatings. It is also extensively used in the production of capacitors, due to its high dielectric constant.

Preparation

Occurrence
Tantalum occurs in the minerals tantalite and columbite (columbium being an archaic name for niobium), which occur in pegmatites, an igneous rock formation. Mixtures of columbite and tantalite are called coltan.  Tantalite was discovered by Anders Gustaf Ekeberg at Ytterby, Sweden, and Kimoto, Finland. The minerals microlite and pyrochlore contain approximately 70% and 10% Ta, respectively.

Refining
Tantalum ores often contain significant amounts of niobium, which is itself a valuable metal. As such, both metals are extracted so that they may be sold. The overall process is one of hydrometallurgy and begins with a leaching step; in which the ore is treated with hydrofluoric acid and sulfuric acid to produce water-soluble hydrogen fluorides, such as the heptafluorotantalate. This allows the metals to be separated from the various non-metallic impurities in the rock.

(FeMn)(NbTa)2O6 + 16 HF → H2[TaF7] + H2[NbOF5] + FeF2 + MnF2 + 6 H2O

The tantalum and niobium hydrogenflorides are then removed from the aqueous solution by liquid-liquid extraction using organic solvents, such as cyclohexanone or methyl isobutyl ketone. This step allows the simple removal of various metal impurities (e.g. iron and manganese) which remain in the aqueous phase in the form of fluorides. Separation of the tantalum and niobium is then achieved by pH adjustment. Niobium requires a higher level of acidity to remain soluble in the organic phase and can hence be selectively removed by extraction into less acidic water.
The pure tantalum hydrogen fluoride solution is then neutralised with aqueous ammonia to give hydrated tantalum oxide (Ta2O5(H2O)x), which is calcinated to tantalum pentoxide (Ta2O5) as described in these idealized equations:

 H2[TaF7] + 5 H2O + 7 NH3 →  Ta2O5(H2O)5 + 7 NH4F
 Ta2O5(H2O)5  →   Ta2O5 + 5 H2O

Natural pure tantalum oxide is known as the mineral tantite, although it is exceedingly rare.

From alkoxides
Tantalum oxide is frequently used in electronics, often in the form of thin films. For these applications it can be produced by MOCVD (or related techniques), which involves the hydrolysis of its volatile halides or alkoxides:

 Ta2(OEt)10 + 5 H2O → Ta2O5 + 10 EtOH
 2 TaCl5 + 5 H2O → Ta2O5 + 10 HCl

Structure and properties 
The crystal structure of tantalum pentoxide has been the matter of some debate. The bulk material is disordered, being either amorphous or polycrystalline; with single crystals being difficult to grow. As such Xray crystallography has largely been limited to powder diffraction, which provides less structural information.

At least 2 polymorphs are known to exist. A low temperature form, known as L- or β-Ta2O5, and the high temperature form known as H- or α-Ta2O5. The transition between these two forms is slow and reversible; taking place between 1000 and 1360 °C, with a mixture of structures existing at intermediate temperatures. The structures of both polymorphs consist of chains built from octahedral TaO6 and pentagonal bipyramidal TaO7 polyhedra sharing opposite vertices; which are further joined by edge-sharing. The overall crystal system is orthorhombic in both cases, with the space group of β-Ta2O5 being identified as Pna2 by single crystal X-ray diffraction.
A high pressure form (Z-Ta2O5) has also been reported, in which the Ta atoms adopt a 7 coordinate geometry to give a monoclinic structure (space group C2).

Purely amorphous tantalum pentoxide has a similar local structure to the crystalline polymorphs, built from TaO6 and TaO7 polyhedra, while the molten liquid phase has a distinct structure based on lower coordination polyhedra, mainly TaO5 and TaO6.

The difficulty in forming material with a uniform structure has led to variations in its reported properties. Like many metal oxides Ta2O5 is an insulator and its band gap has variously been reported as being between 3.8 and 5.3 eV, depending on the method of manufacture. In general the more amorphous the material the greater its observed band gap.
These observed values are significantly higher than those predicted by computational chemistry (2.3 - 3.8 eV).

Its dielectric constant is typically about 25 although values of over 50 have been reported. In general tantalum pentoxide is considered to be a high-k dielectric material.

Reactions 
Ta2O5 does not react appreciably with either HCl or HBr, however it will dissolve in hydrofluoric acid, and reacts with potassium bifluoride and HF according to the following equation:

Ta2O5  +  4 KHF2 + 6 HF   →   2 K2[TaF7]  +  5 H2O

Ta2O5 can be reduced to metallic Ta via the use of metallic reductants such as calcium and aluminium.

Ta2O5 + 5 Ca →  2 Ta + 5 CaO

Uses

In electronics 
Owing to its high band gap and dielectric constant, tantalum pentoxide has found a variety of uses in electronics, particularly in tantalum capacitors. These are used in automotive electronics, cell phones, and pagers, electronic circuitry; thin-film components; and high-speed tools. In the 1990s, interest grew in the use of tantalum oxide as a high-k dielectric for DRAM capacitor applications.

It is used in on-chip metal-insulator-metal capacitors for high frequency CMOS integrated circuits. Tantalum oxide may have applications as the charge trapping layer for non-volatile memories. There are applications  of tantalum oxide in resistive switching memories.

Other uses 
Due to its high refractive index, Ta2O5 has been utilized in the fabrication of the glass of photographic lenses. 
It can also be deposited as an optical coating with typical applications being antireflection and multilayer filter coatings in near UV to near infrared.

References

Tantalum compounds
High-κ dielectrics
Transition metal oxides